Plator is a genus of Asian araneomorph spiders in the family Trochanteriidae, first described by Eugène Simon in 1880.

Species
 it contains seventeen species:
Plator bowo Zhu, Tang, Zhang & Song, 2006 — China
Plator cyclicus Lin & Li, 2020 — China
Plator dazhonghua Lin & Li, 2020 — China
Plator hanyikani Lin & Li, 2020 — China
Plator himalayaensis Tikader & Gajbe, 1976 — India
Plator indicus Simon, 1897 — India
Plator insolens Simon, 1880 — China
Plator kamurai Lin & Li, 2020 — China
Plator kashmirensis Tikader & Gajbe, 1973 — India
Plator nipponicus (Kishida, 1914) — China, Korea, Japan
Plator pandeae Tikader, 1969 — India, China
Plator pennatus Platnick, 1976 — China
Plator qiului Lin & Li, 2020 — China
Plator serratus Lin & Zhu, 2016 — China
Plator soastus Zamani & Marusik, 2022 — Pakistan
Plator solanensis Tikader & Gajbe, 1976 — India
Plator yunlong Zhu, Tang, Zhang & Song, 2006 — China

References

External links

Araneomorphae genera
Trochanteriidae